was an anime series aired in 1977 in Japan. There were 23 episodes aired at 25 minutes each.

It is often mistakenly believed to be a spinoff of the earlier and more popular, series Attack No. 1 (1969-1971), due in part to the involvement of several staffers (including directors Kurokawa and Okabe and writer Yamazaki) who had worked on the prior series. It is not an official spinoff, and it is more likely to have been inspired by the popularity of Attack No. 1.

It is also known in Europe as Smash (French) and Mimì e le ragazze della pallavolo (Italian).

Original Story
The story is about Mimi Hijiiri, a student with just one school year remaining, who decides to revitalize a volleyball team low on morale from the death of one of its team members from an accident.

Concept
The series was strictly created as a tribute to the gold medal the Japanese women's volleyball team earned in the 1976 Olympics.

Staff
Directed by: Fumio Kurokawa
Series Composition: Eiji Okabe
Screenwriter: Haruya Yamazaki
Produced by: Kôichi Motohashi
Producer: Ryûji Matsudo
Creator: Shiro Jinbo
Music: Nobuyoshi Koshibe
Cast: Mami Koyama (Mimi Hijiri), Kaoru Kurusu (Rouki Sei), Kazue Komiya (Yukari Sugihara), Keiko Yokozawa (Sumie Nishii), Rihoko Yoshida (Asuka Ichijou) etc.

Reaction
While the show would eventually aired in the European market in the 1980s in countries such as France and Italy, the plot and concept was too similar to its predecessor Attack No. 1 and ratings were low. The show ceased production after only 23 episodes.

Trivia
 In the French version "Smash", Mimi is Virginia Tessier. In the Italian dub, she is Mimi Miceri and she's half-Japanese and half Italian. In both languages, most of the other character names were changed as well.
 Mitsuko Horie performed both the opening and ending theme songs in the original Japanese version.

References

External links

 Attack on Tomorrow! on Nippon Animation's website 
 Attack on Tomorrow! on Nippon Animation's website 

1977 anime television series debuts
Manga series
Nippon Animation
Romance anime and manga
Shōjo manga
Volleyball in anime and manga